International Orthodox Christian Charities, Inc. (or IOCC), based in Baltimore, Maryland, is the official international humanitarian agency of the Assembly of Canonical Orthodox Bishops of the United States of America. Since its inception in 1992, IOCC has distributed emergency relief and development assistance to families and communities in more than 60 countries. IOCC does not provide funds for Church missions such as religious education or missionary work.  All funds collected by the agency (minus administrative expenses) are instead used for humanitarian aid. All assistance is provided solely on the basis of need, and benefits families, refugees and displaced persons, the elderly, school children, orphans, and people with disabilities.

Through its US headquarters and field offices around the world (Banja Luka, Bosnia-Herzegovina; Addis Ababa, Ethiopia; Tbilisi, Georgia; Jerusalem/West Bank/Gaza; Amman, Jordan; Beirut, Lebanon; Minneapolis, Minnesota; Belgrade, Serbia)  IOCC assists people living in some of the most volatile places in the world, including Gaza, Kosovo, and in Syria, where IOCC has provided relief to more than 3.3 million displaced and exiled people suffering through a catastrophic civil war.  IOCC is one of few agencies still working inside Syria and continues to support one of the largest humanitarian networks on the ground in the country.

IOCC carries a rating of four stars from Charity Navigator, the highest rating the organization awards. IOCC is a member of InterAction, the largest alliance of U.S.–based secular and faith-based organizations working to improve the lives of the world's poorest and most vulnerable populations.

See also 
 Charitable organization
 Eastern Orthodox Church
 Assembly of Canonical Orthodox Bishops of the United States of America

External links 
 IOCC website
 Profile page on Charity Navigator
 http://assemblyofbishops.org/
 IOCC Profile page http://actalliance.org/about/members/international-orthodox-christian-charities-iocc/

References 

Charities based in Maryland
Religious charities based in the United States
Eastern Orthodox organizations established in the 20th century
Organizations established in 1992
Eastern Orthodoxy in Maryland